Beata Nelson is an American swimmer. She specializes in short course sprint events. Known for her powerful underwater dolphin kicks, Nelson is the current American Record holder in the women's 100 SC Individual Medley event.

References 

1998 births
Living people
American female swimmers
Wisconsin Badgers women's swimmers